The Gila MBPV is a mine protected vehicle from South Africa developed by private investors and manufactured by IVEMA and similar to the more popular Casspir. The vehicle was introduced in 2006 and production of the vehicle is at IVEMA facility in Midrand, South Africa.

It is four-wheeled and is being used for transport of troops. It can hold a crew of two, plus 9 passengers.

Operators
: 24 units to United Nations/African Union forces (UNAMID) in Darfur, Sudan
: 6 supplied by Canada for Military Police of Burkina Faso
: private buyer and also for use as ambulance in Dafur

Variants

 Gila APC
 Gila Armoured Ambulance
 Missile Carrier
 mortar carrier
 electronic warfare vehicle
 battlefield re-supply vehicle
 command post vehicle

See also
Buffalo (mine protected vehicle), a 6x6 originally built by Force Protection Inc
Cougar (vehicle), a 4x4 originally built by Force Protection Inc
Buffel, an early South African mine protected vehicle
Oshkosh M-ATV, current generation lighter weight mine protected vehicle manufactured by Oshkosh Corporation
Mahindra Mine Protected Vehicle, design inspired by the Casspir
Casspir

References

External links

Armoured personnel carriers of South Africa